Strike It Rich is a game show that was broadcast on American radio from June 29, 1947 to December 27, 1957, on CBS and NBC. It was broadcast on television as well, starting in 1951. People in need of money (such as for medical treatment or a destitute family) appeared and told their tale of woe, then tried to win money by answering four questions. If the contestant did not win any money, the emcee opened the "Heart Line", which was a phone line to viewers who wished to donate to the contestant's family.

The radio series aired on CBS from 1947 to 1950. On May 1, 1950, the show moved to NBC, and was broadcast by NBC until December 27, 1957. Todd Russell was the host from 1947 to 1948, followed by Warren Hull.

The television version of the game show premiered May 7, 1951, on CBS's daytime lineup. It ran until January 3, 1958, including a prime time version which aired from July 4, 1951 to January 12, 1955.

Premise 
Strike It Rich was a game show that aired on American radio and television 1947 to 1957 on CBS and NBC.  People in need of money (such as for medical treatment or a destitute family) appeared and told their tale of woe, then tried to win money by answering four relatively easy questions. Each player would be given $30 and bet any of their bankroll on answering each question after being given the category. If the contestant didn't win any money, the emcee opened the "Heart Line", a telephone hotline for viewers who wished to donate to the contestant and their family.

Original broadcast run 
Sponsored by Luden's Cough Drops, the radio series aired on CBS from June 29, 1947, to April 30, 1950. Todd Russell was the host from 1947 to 1948, followed by Warren Hull. On May 1, 1950, the show moved to NBC, where it aired on weekdays, sponsored by Colgate, until December 27, 1957.

The television series premiered May 7, 1951 on CBS's daytime lineup and ran until January 3, 1958. Its popularity led CBS to air a prime time version from July 4, 1951, to January 12, 1955. The nighttime version finished #25 in the Nielsen ratings for the 1951–1952 season and #21 for 1952–1953.

Two attempts to revive the series were made in 1973 and 1978, although neither was successful. Another quiz show in 1986 used the same name but was otherwise unrelated.

Episode status 
Recordings of the series were destroyed, partly owing to network standards of the era and partly owing to its controversial nature. Four episodes are held at the UCLA Film and Television Archive, and a few are held by the Paley Center for Media. The J. Fred & Leslie W. MacDonald Collection of the Library of Congress has one kinescoped program from November 28, 1956.

Reception

Controversy 
While it had a simple format, the show was controversial during the 11 years it aired. Some applauded Strike It Rich for helping out some less fortunate people, as well as showcasing the sincere charity and goodwill of viewers who donated through the Heart Line. Others found it a sickening spectacle that exploited the less fortunate contestants for the vicarious thrills of the viewers and the selfish gain of the sponsors.

Part of the criticism was that it promised more than it could deliver. Though the show received between 3,000 and 5,000 letters per week from needy people wishing to win what would be (to them) life-changing sums of money, only a small fraction of those could be selected. Although this was partly due to the limits of television production (the series, although ambitious in its goals, could not reasonably assist every person needing help at the same time), critics stated that the show picked mostly those thought to have the most interesting tales of woe.

Complaints 

Despite warnings by the show's producers, a number of people hoping to be contestants exhausted their money to travel to New York, only to be rejected and end up relying on charities such as the Salvation Army to help them return home. This led to a large number of complaints from charities and local government agencies:
 The New York City commissioner of welfare called Strike It Rich "a disgusting spectacle and a national disgrace." The welfare commissioner brought the show to court on charges of unlicensed fund-raising and actually won a conviction.
 The supervisor of the Travelers Aid Society said, "Putting human misery on display can hardly be called right."
 The general director of the Family Service Association of America said flatly, "Victims of poverty, illness, and everyday misfortune should not be made a public spectacle or seemingly to be put in the position of begging for charity."
 The New York legislature looked into the controversy, but later dropped it, claiming it "lacked jurisdiction."
 TV Guide called it "a despicable travesty on the very nature of charity."

Networks' response 
CBS and NBC remained unconcerned over the charity controversy, stating: "We don't want to do anything that would antagonize the sponsor." Statements such as this allowed companies such as Geritol and Revlon to continue to control all aspects of the shows they sponsored. Strike It Rich last aired on CBS daytime in its 11:30 am time slot on Friday, January 3, 1958. It was replaced on Monday, January 6 by game show newcomer Dotto. Dotto would go on to become the highest rated daytime show of the 1950s until its cancellation seven months later, the first casualty of the 1950s quiz show scandals.

Revivals 
Two attempts to revive the series were made in 1973 and 1978, although neither was successful. Another quiz show broadcast in 1986–87 used the same name but was otherwise unrelated.

Merchandise 
A board game of Strike it Rich featuring host Warren Hull on the cover was released by Lowell Toy Mfg. in 1956.

See also 
 Queen for a Day

References

External links 

 
 Streaming episodes of Strike It Rich radio program from Old Time Radio Researchers Library

1947 radio programme debuts
1958 radio programme endings
1951 American television series debuts
1958 American television series endings
1940s American radio programs
1950s American radio programs
1940s American game shows
1950s American game shows
American radio game shows
Radio programs adapted into television shows
Black-and-white American television shows
CBS original programming
English-language television shows
Lost American television shows
NBC original programming
NBC radio programs